Mohammad Hejazi (محمد حجازی; in Persian, April 14, 1900 – January 30, 1974) was an Iranian novelist, short-story writer, playwright, essayist, translator, a government official and member of the senate.

Life
He was born in Tehran and  died in Tehran in 1974 at the age of 73.

He was grandson of Naser al-Din Shah Qajar of the Qajar dynasty, son of a high ranking Qajar Prince and official, Nasár-Allah Mirza Mostawfi, Vazir Lashgar Moti od Dowleh the first (minister of War and governor – Hakemof Esterabad), he received his elementary and high school education in Tehran at St. Louis, the French Catholic missionary school for boys. In 1919 he was employed by the ministry of post, telegraph, and telephone and in 1921 he was sent by the same ministry to continue his education in France. There he completed a degree in telecommunications (telegraf-e bisim) and electrical engineering, as well as political science.

Political career

On his return to Persia in 1929, Hejazi was appointed director of the personnel department of the ministry, and in 1932 became the founding editor of Majalla-ye post o telegraf o telefon (AÚrianpur, p. 244; Sadr Haæemi, Jara÷ed o majallat I, no. 343, pp. 69–71). In late 1934, he was transferred to the ministry of finance and appointed chief de cabinet to the minister of finance, Ali Akbar Davar (q.v.). When  (The Bureau for Public Enlightenment) was established in 1938, Hejazi was appointed chairman of its press committee. In the summer of 1943 Hejazi was appointed director of the Office of Publications and Publicity and later the head of the bureau overseeing Persian students in Europe. In the cabinet of prime minister Hosayn ¿Ala÷, in the spring of 1951, Hejazi served as deputy prime minister, Following the 1953 coup d'état (q.v.), Hejazi was invited at the suggestion of ¿Ala÷, the court minister at the time, to weekly audiences with the shah to discuss cultural, social, and political issues, as a special adviser. It was in these meetings that the idea for a series of books on "self-made men" took shape; the shah himself wrote a biography of his father, Reza Shah, and Hejazi a biography of the famous painter Kamal-al-Molk (Tehran, 1956). At the latter part of his political career, Hejazi served for two terms, from 1954 until 1963, as an appointed senator and two more terms as an elected senator from Tehran until 1972, two years before his death.
 
A study of Hejazi's life as a Persian aristocrat, writer, politician, and bureaucrat reveals him as a member of a small group of Persians with Western-style education in the early twentieth century who display a sense of responsibility and mission to change and modernize Persia and to introduce Western ideas and modes of behavior to the young people of their country. In keeping with this sense of mission and responsibility are, for instance, Hejazi's efforts in translating into Persian works such as Freud's The Interpretation of Dreams (tr. as Ro÷ya, Tehran, 1953), and the short treatise written while a student, Telegraf-e bisim (Wireless Telegraph, Berlin, 1923). In fact, Hejazi continued his efforts in the latter decades of his life through his involvement in writing several high-school textbooks.

Works

Novels

Homa (1928)
Parichehr (1929)
Ziba (1930)
Ayena (Mirror) (1937)
Andisa (Thought) 1940
Sagar (Goblet) (1951)
Ahang (Melody) (1951)
Nasim (Breeze) (1961)
Parvana (1953)
Seresk (Tears) (1954)
..khaney pidari

Plays

Mahamud Aqa ra wakil konid (Pick Mahamud Aqa for Parliament) (1951)
Arus-e farangi (European bride)
Jang (War)
Mosaferat-e Qom (A trip to Qom)

References
Ḥejāzi, Moḥammad Moṭiʿ-Al-Dawla

Iranian writers
1901 births
1974 deaths
Members of the Academy of Persian Language and Literature
Iranian male short story writers